Sera Markoff (born 6 July 1971) is an American astrophysicist and full professor of theoretical high energy astrophysics at the Anton Pannekoek Institute for Astronomy, University of Amsterdam. She is a member of the Event Horizon Telescope team that produced the first image of a black hole.

Education and career 
Sera Markoff studied physics at the Massachusetts Institute of Technology and was awarded a Bachelor's of Science in Physics in 1993. In 1996 she gained a Master of Arts from the University of Arizona in theoretical astrophysics, and in 2000 she gained a PhD in the same field. She was an Alexander von Humboldt Foundation Research Fellow at the Max Planck Institute for Radio Astronomy in Bonn from 2000 to 2002 and a National Science Foundation Astronomy & Astrophysics Postdoctoral Fellow at the Massachusetts Institute of Technology from 2002 to 2005. In 2006 she joined the University of Amsterdam as an assistant professor, and was promoted to associate professor in 2008 and to professor in 2017. 

In 2019 she became editor of the journal Astroparticle Physics.

Research 
Sera Markoff's research focuses on the interface between astrophysics and particle physics, in particular problems relating to processes occurring around dense objects such as black holes. She is a member of a number of large scale research projects including the Low-Frequency ARay (LOFAR), Cherenkov Telescope Array and Event Horizon Telescope, which produced the first image of a black hole. She is a member of the leadership of the Event Horizon Telescope project where she serves as a member of the science council and as one of the working group coordinators.

Awards and honors 
 Beatrice M. Tinsley Centennial Visiting Professorship University of Texas at Austin 2015
 Fellow of the American Physical Society 2014
 VICI Award 2015
 VIDI Personal Career Award 2007

Significant publications 
Markoff S et al. (2005). Going with the flow: can the base of jets subsume the role of compact accretion disk coronae? Astrophys. J. 635: 1203–1216

References

1971 births
Living people
Academic staff of the University of Amsterdam
University of Arizona alumni
 Fellows of the American Physical Society